Antiochus XII Dionysus Epiphanes Philopator Callinicus (between 124 and 109 BC – 82 BC) was a Hellenistic Seleucid monarch who reigned as King of Syria between 87 and 82 BC. The youngest son of Antiochus VIII and, most likely, his Egyptian wife Tryphaena, Antiochus XII lived during a period of civil war between his father and his uncle Antiochus IX, which ended with the assassination of Antiochus VIII in 96 BC. Antiochus XII's four brothers laid claim to the throne, eliminated Antiochus IX as a claimant, and waged war against his heir Antiochus X.

By 87 BC, only two claimants remained, both brothers of Antiochus XII: Demetrius III and Philip I. The realm of Demetrius III was initially centered in Damascus but later extended over most of Syria. Demetrius III was defeated by Philip I and went into exile in Parthia, allowing Antiochus XII to gain control of Damascus while Philip I remained in the Syrian capital Antioch. Antiochus XII consolidated his territory within inner Syria and did not seek to expand into the territories of Philip I, who attempted to annex Damascus but was repulsed. Antiochus XII focused his attention on Syria's southern reaches into which the Judaeans and Nabataeans sought to expand.

Antiochus XII reinforced his southern frontier and warred with his neighbors, conducting two campaigns against Nabataea that included engagements with Judea. After several victories in his first campaign, Antiochus XII was killed towards the end of his second campaign against the Nabateans at the Battle of Cana in 82 BC. Damascus was captured by the forces of the Nabatean King Aretas III, and the Syrian throne was claimed by Antiochus X's widow Cleopatra Selene and her son Antiochus XIII.

Name and background

Antiochus, Greek for "resolute in contention", was a dynastic name borne by many Seleucid monarchs. The Seleucid dynasty's founder Seleucus I named the capital of Syria, Antioch, in honor of his father Antiochus. Antiochus XII was the fifth and youngest son of Antiochus VIII and his Ptolemaic Egyptian wife Tryphaena, who married in 124 BC. In 109 BC, Tryphaena was killed by Antiochus VIII's half-brother Antiochus IX, who fought with Antiochus VIII from 113 BC for the throne of Syria. Antiochus XII's brothers were Seleucus VI, Antiochus XI, Philip I and Demetrius III.

Following Antiochus VIII's assassination in 96 BC, his second wife, Tryphaena's sister Cleopatra Selene, married Antiochus IX and then his son Antiochus X, who fought with Antiochus XII's four brothers for the throne. By 88 BC, only Demetrius III and Philip I remained; Demetrius III was originally based in Damascus before extending his authority to most of Syria. He was defeated by Philip I and his Parthian allies in 87 BC and exiled to Parthia, where he died of an unknown illness. Philip I took control of the capital, while Cleopatra Selene, now a widow, took shelter in Ptolemais with her sons by Antiochus X.

Reign
The departure of Demetrius III left a power vacuum in Damascus that was filled by Antiochus XII. Coins minted during the reign of Demetrius III are dated to the Seleucid year (SE) 225 (88/87 BC), while the earliest coins minted during the reign of Antiochus XII have the date 226 SE (87/86 BC), suggesting there was a rapid assumption of power by Antiochus XII. Monarchs of the Hellenistic period did not use regnal numbers, which is a more modern practice, but instead used epithets to distinguish themselves from similarly named monarchs; Three of Antiochus XII's four epithets, Epiphanes (illustrious)–previously used by his father, Philopator (father-loving) and Callinicus (nobly victorious), served to emphasize the ancestry of his grandfather Demetrius II in contrast to the line of the latter's brother Antiochus VII, which was represented by Antiochus IX and his descendants; Callinicus may have been an echo of Demetrius II's epithet Nikator (victorious). He likely used his other epithet Dionysus to associate himself with the Greek god of wine in his role as conqueror of the East. Antiochus XII was depicted on coinage with an exaggerated hawked nose in the likeness of his father, as a means of strengthening the legitimacy of his succession.

Policies and territory

According to historian Alfred Bellinger, Antiochus XII may have received assistance from Ptolemaic Egypt to gain his throne. This view is reflected in Antiochus XII's policies, which were targeted at the south in Nabataea and Judaea, but not towards expansion within the kingdom of Syria. His dominion was limited to inner Syria, centered on Damascus, which served as his capital and primary mint. Antiochus XII also ruled over the town of Gadara, governed by an official named Philotas. In 100 BC, Gadara had been conquered by the Hasmonean king of Judea Alexander Jannaeus, who partially destroyed its walls, but it was recaptured by the Seleucids in 93 BC. Gadara held great strategic importance for Syria as it served as a major military hub for operations in the south. Controlling it was vital to the war effort against the Judaeans, which led Antiochus to rebuild the city's defenses in 228 SE (85/84 BC). Historian Aryeh Kasher suggested that Antiochus XII dug what the first-century historian Josephus called the "trench of Antiochus" (or valley of Antiochus) to protect Damascus from the Nabataeans; the trench was probably located in the Hula Valley.

Seleucid coins often had depictions of their Greek deities, but the silver coinage of Antiochus XII depicted the supreme Semitic god Hadad on the reverse, possibly in recognition of the shrinking borders of the kingdom, which convinced the monarch of the importance of the local cults. By promoting indigenous deities, Seleucid kings hoped to gain the support of their non-Greek subjects. According to Bellinger, the use of Hadad indicated that Antiochus XII placed focus on his "intention of being first and foremost king of Damascus". During his reign, Demetrius III had also depicted a Semitic deity, Atargatis, on his currency. In the view of historian , the change of coin imagery from Atargatis to Hadad probably served two goals: to imply that Antiochus XII had a different policy focus than his predecessor, and to demonstrate his intention of maintaining a good relationship with the Semitic population of Damascus, who comprised the majority of the inhabitants, to avoid tension with Greek settlers. Seleucid kings presented themselves as protectors of Hellenism and patronized intellectuals and philosophers, but Antiochus XII may have adopted a different attitude; he ordered the expulsion of such scholars.

Military campaigns

Early in his reign, Antiochus XII attacked the Nabataeans and the Judaeans, whose territories both lay south of his own. This conflict was recorded by Josephus, although he made no mention of the name of the Nabataean king. Josephus mentioned two campaigns against the Nabataeans, but did not explain the motives leading the Syrian King to attack them. Modern scholars presented several theories. In the view of Israel Shatzman, Antiochus XII may have feared the growing power of the Nabataeans, who were expanding into southern Syria. Zayn Bilkadi suggested that Antiochus XII wanted to take control over the Nabataeans' crude oil industry, while Alexander Fantalkin and Oren Tal suggested that the Nabataeans actively supported Philip I in his attempts to take control over Antiochus XII's realm.

First Nabataean campaign and the incursions of Philip I
Antiochus XII's first Nabataean campaign was launched in 87 BC, and might have included a battle near Motho, modern Imtan in the region of Hauran, as proposed by the historian Hans Peter Roschinski, who drew on the writings of Stephanus of Byzantium. The Byzantine historian preserved in his book, Ethica, fragments from a lost work by the historian Uranius of Apamea, who wrote a book titled Arabica, which has been dated to 300 AD. In the account of Uranius, King Antigonus I is killed at Motho by a king of the Arabs named Rabbel. The name Motho could refer to a northern city in Hauran or a southern city in Moab. The name of Antigonus was regularly "corrected" to Antiochus by different scholars who believed that Uranius was referring to Antiochus XII. Roschinski considered it conceivable that Stephanus was conflating two events taking place during the reign of the Nabataean King Rabbel I: a battle of Antiochus XII's first Nabataean campaign at Motho in the north, and the battle from the second Nabataean campaign in which Antiochus XII was killed. Shatzman, on the other hand, noted that nowhere in his work did Stephanus indicate that the battle of Motho took place in the north.

Taking advantage of his brother's absence, Philip I seized Damascus, aided by the governor of the city's citadel, Milesius, who opened the gates to him. According to Josephus, Milesius received no reward from Philip I, who attributed the betrayal to the general's fear, leading Milesius to betray Philip I, who had left the city to attend an event in the nearby hippodrome. The general closed the gates, locking Philip I out, and awaited the return of Antiochus XII, who had hastily ended his campaign when he heard of his brother's occupation of the city. Modern scholars noted that Seleucid currency, struck during campaigns against a rival (or usurper), portrayed the King sporting a beard. During his first two years, Antiochus XII's visage appeared beardless, but this changed in 228 SE (85/84 BC). This is possibly related to Philip I's attack on Damascus, but this supposition has little support, as Antiochus XII failed to take any action against his brother. No coins were minted during the period that Philip I held Damascus, indicating only a brief occupation of the city.

Second Nabataean campaign, war in Judea and death
Although his territory directly abutted Nabataean territory, for his second Nabataean campaign Antiochus XII instead chose to march his forces through Judaea along the coast, probably to attack the Nabataean-dominated Negev, which would have cut off the port city of Gaza, threatened Nabataean Mediterranean trade, and curbed Nabataean ambitions in the Transjordan. This route would have allowed Antiochus XII to keep Alexander Jannaeus at bay. According to Josephus, the Judaean King feared Antiochus XII's intentions and ordered the "Yannai Line" to be built, which consisted of a trench that fronted a defensive wall dotted with wooden towers. The trench stretched  from Caphersaba to the sea near Joppa. Antiochus XII leveled the trench, burned the fortifications, and continued his march into Nabataean territory.

The account of the campaign, written by Josephus, is subject to some debate; the historian wrote that Antiochus XII's forces defeated those of Alexander Jannaeus, but the eighth-century historian George Syncellus mentioned a defeat suffered by Antiochus XII at the hands of the Judaean king. The existence of the Yannai Line has been questioned by several historians, and Josephus's explanation of Alexander Jannaeus's attempt to stop the march of Antiochus XII, because of his fears of the latter's intentions, is unsatisfactory. Both the Nabataeans and Syrians were enemies of Judea and it would have been to Alexander Jannaeus's benefit if those two powers were in conflict. Syncellus may have been referring to an earlier confrontation between the Syrian king and Alexander Jannaeus. Thus the statement of Syncellus supports the notion that Antiochus XII's second Nabataean campaign was also aimed at Judea; perhaps Antiochus XII sought to annex the coastal cities of Alexander Jannaeus as retribution for the defeat mentioned by Syncellus. Another objective would be subduing the Judaeans to keep them from attacking Syria while Antiochus XII was busy in Nabataea.

The final engagement between the forces of Antiochus XII and the Nabataeans occurred near the village of Cana, the location of which is unknown, but is generally assumed by modern scholars to be southwest of the Dead Sea. Historian Siegfried Mittmann considered it to be synonymous with Qina, modern-day Horvat Uza, as mentioned by Josephus in Book 15 of his Antiquities. Details of the battle, as written by Josephus, spoke of the Nabataeans employing a feigned retreat, then counterattacking the Syrian forces before their ranks could be ordered. Antiochus XII managed to rally his troops and weathered the attack, but he fought in the front lines, jeopardizing his life, and he eventually fell. The year of Antiochus XII's death is debated, but his last coins struck in Damascus are dated to 230 SE (83/82 BC).

Aftermath and legacy

According to Josephus, the death of the King resulted in a rout of the Syrian forces, with many being killed in the field or during the retreat. Survivors of the rout sheltered in Cana, where most died of starvation. Antiochus XII was the last energetic Seleucid king. Little is recorded of Philip I after his attempt at annexing Damascus, which was left without a protector after the death of Antiochus XII. Fearing the Ituraean ruler Ptolemy, the people of Damascus invited Aretas III of Nabataea to take the city. The numismatist Oliver D. Hoover suggested that Aretas III did not hold Damascus for long before the city returned to Seleucid possession.

The identity of Antiochus XII's wife remains unknown, but according to the sixth-century historian John Malalas, whose work is considered generally unreliable by scholars, the King had two daughters, Cleopatra and Antiochis. Cleopatra Selene, who went into hiding after the death of Antiochus X in 224 SE (89/88 BC), took advantage of Antiochus XII's death and declared her son Antiochus XIII king with herself as queen regent and regnant. Coins struck during her regency show the marks of the Damascus mint. Archeologist Nicholas L. Wright suggested that Cleopatra Selene's takeover of Damascus took place after 80 BC. Josephus called Antiochus XII the last Seleucid king, and Malalas, according to the translation of the historian Glanville Downey, followed suit; the last Seleucid king was in fact Antiochus XIII, who was dethroned in 64 BC after Antioch was annexed by the Romans.

Family tree

|-
|style="text-align: left;"|Citations:

|-

See also

 List of Syrian monarchs
 Timeline of Syrian history

Notes

References

Citations

Sources

External links

 The biography of Antiochus XII in the website of the numismatist Petr Veselý.
 A collection of Antiochus XII's coins in the website of the numismatist Petr Veselý.

2nd-century BC births
82 BC deaths
1st-century BC rulers in Asia
1st-century BC Seleucid rulers
Ancient Macedonians killed in battle
Kings of Syria
Monarchs killed in action
Seleucid rulers
Year of birth unknown